The Second Vagnorius Cabinet was the 8th cabinet of Lithuania since 1990. It consisted of the Prime Minister and 17 government ministers.

History 
Gediminas Vagnorius was appointed the Prime Minister by President Algirdas Brazauskas on 4 December 1996, after the Homeland Union decisively won the elections in October. It was the second time Vagnorius was appointed the Prime Minister, having previously led the 3rd government between 1991 and 1992. The government received its mandate and started its work on 10 December 1996, after the Seimas gave assent to its program.

In 1998, number of ministries (and ministers) was reduced from 17 to 14. Ministry of Industry and Trade, the Ministry of Energy and the Ministry of Economy were merged into the Ministry of Economy, the Ministry of Construction and Urbanistics, the Ministry of Environmental Protection and the Ministry of Forestry were merged into Ministry of Environment.

The government served for almost three years before resigning on 4 May 1999 amid criticism of its response to the 1998 Russian financial crisis and disagreements between Vagnorius and Vytautas Landsbergis, the leader of the Homeland Union. The government continued to serve in an acting capacity (with Irena Degutienė as the acting Prime Minister), until the new Homeland Union government headed by Rolandas Paksas started its work on 10 June 1999.

Cabinet
The following ministers served on the Second Vagnorius Cabinet.

Notes

References 

Cabinet of Lithuania
1999 establishments in Lithuania
1999 disestablishments in Lithuania
Cabinets established in 1999
Cabinets disestablished in 1999